Pernaska is an Albanian surname. Notable people with the surname include:

Ilir Përnaska (born 1951), Albanian football player
Lajla Pernaska (born 1961), Albanian politician

Albanian-language surnames